Darreh Chapi may refer to:
Darreh Chapi, Ilam, Iran
Darreh Chapi, Kohgiluyeh and Boyer-Ahmad, Iran
Darreh Chapi, Lorestan, Iran